Northern Lights Public Schools, legally known as Northern Lights School Division No. 69, is a public school authority within the Canadian province of Alberta operated out of Bonnyville.

See also 
List of school authorities in Alberta

References

External links 

 
School districts in Alberta